Stephen Orise Oru is a Nigerian politician. He is a former Minister of Niger Delta Affairs of the Federal Republic of Nigeria.

Early life and education

Stephen Oru was born in Delta State, Ughelli North L.G.A. He attended Government College, Ughelli. He obtained a Bachelor of Arts in 1974 and a Masters of Arts in Education in 1976 from Ahmadu Bello University. He furthered his studies in the United States where he obtained a PhD from Ohio State University, Columbus, Ohio in 1978

Career

Oru began his political career in 1982 with the National Party of Nigeria (NPN) as the Secretary of Youth Wing, Ughelli LGA, Bendel State. Since then, he has held various positions within Nigeria's political scene; some of which include:

 State Youth Leader, National Party of Nigeria, Bendel State - 1983
 State Financial Secretary, National Party of Nigeria, Bendel State - 1983
 Member of Transition Committee, Bendel State - 1983
 Founding Member of the People's Democratic Party of Nigeria - 1998
 Deputy National Secretary, People's Democratic Party of Nigeria - 2005-2008
 Secretary, PDP Disciplinary Committee - 2005-2008
 Member, Delta State PDP Caucus - 2005-2008
 Coordinator PDP Foreign Chapters - 2005-2008
 Acting National Secretary, PDP - 2007
 Member and Secretary, PDP National Reconciliation Committee under the Chairmanship of His Excellency, Dr. Alex Ekwueme, GCON - 2007
 Delta State Coordinator, Goodluck/Sambo Presidential Campaign Organization - 2010-2011
 Member, South-South Goodluck-Sambo Presidential Campaign Council - 2010-2011
 Member, Delta State Gubernatorial Campaign Council- 2010-2011
 Member, Delta State People's Democratic Party's Reconciliation Committee - 2011
 PDP National Vice Chairman(South-South) 2012-2014

Other notable non-political capacities held by Oru in the past:

 Member of Senate, University of Benin - 1982-1983
 Director, Integrated Development Services Limited (IDSL), a Subsidiary of the Nigerian National Petroleum Corporation - 2001-2004
 Chairman, National Board of Technical Education (NBTE) - 2005-2007
 Chairman, Governing Board of Delta State College of Education - 2007-2009
 Chairman, Governing Board of Delta State Polytechnic. 2009-2014
 Member, Ahmadu Bello University Council - 2009-2011
 Chairman, University of Calabar Teaching Hospital, Cross River State - 2013-2014

References

Living people
Urhobo people
People from Delta State
Ahmadu Bello University alumni
Ohio State University alumni
Peoples Democratic Party (Nigeria) politicians
Year of birth missing (living people)